Gartnerhallen is a Norwegian agricultural cooperative that operates processing plants related to vegetables, fruit, potatoes and berries. It is owned by 1,400 gardeners and potato farmers.  The cooperative was started in 1930 and in 1997 is went over to a pure interest group with focus on manufacturing, product development and innovation. Major customers include Norgesgruppen and Bama Gruppen who the cooperative has long term contracts with.

References

Agricultural cooperatives in Norway
Food and drink companies of Norway
Food and drink companies established in 1930
Norwegian companies established in 1930
Agriculture companies established in 1930